As a discipline, cultural analysis is based on using qualitative research methods of the arts, humanities, social sciences, in particular ethnography and anthropology, to collect data on cultural phenomena and to interpret cultural representations and practices; in an effort to gain new knowledge or understanding through analysis of that data and cultural processes. This is particularly useful for understanding and mapping trends, influences, effects, and affects within cultures.

There are four themes to sociological cultural analysis:

1. Adaptation and Change
This refers to how well a certain culture adapts to its surroundings by being used and developed. Some examples of this are foods, tools, home, surroundings, art, etc. that show how the given culture adapted. Also, this aspect aims to show how the given culture makes the environment more accommodating.

2. How culture is used to survive
How the given culture helps its members survive the environment.

3. Holism, Specificity
The ability to put the observations into a single collection, and presenting it in a coherent manner.

4. Expressions
This focuses on studying the expressions and performance of everyday culture.

Cultural Analysis in the Humanities
This developed at the intersection of cultural studies, comparative literature, art history, fine art, philosophy, literary theory, theology, anthropology. It developed an interdisciplinary approach to the study of texts, images, films, and all related cultural practices. It offers an interdisciplinary approach to the analysis of cultural representations and practices.

Cultural Analysis is also a method for rethinking our relation to history because it makes visible the position of researcher, writer or student.  The social and cultural present from which we look at past cultural practices—history— shapes the interpretations that are made of the past, while cultural analysis also reveals how the past shapes the present through the role of cultural memory for instance.  Cultural analysis understands culture, therefore, as a constantly changing set of practices that are in dialogue with the past as it has been registered through texts, images, buildings, documents, stories, myths.

In addition to having a relation to disciplines also interested in cultures as what people do and say, believe and think, such as ethnography and anthropology, cultural analysis as a practice in the humanities considers the texts and images, the codes and behaviours, the beliefs and imaginings that you might study in literature, philosophy, art history.  But cultural analysis does not confine the meanings to the disciplinary methods. It allows and requires dialogue across many ways of understanding what people have done and what people are doing through acts, discourses, practices, statements.  Cultural analysis crosses the boundaries between disciplines but also between formal and informal cultural activities.

The major purpose of cultural analysis is to develop analytical tools for reading and understanding a wide range of cultural practices and forms, past and present.

See also
Girl Heroes
Semiotics of culture
Tartu–Moscow Semiotic School
Daniel Seddiqui

External links
Amsterdam School for Cultural Analysis
Cultural Analysis: An Interdisciplinary Forum on Folklore and Popular Culture
Institute for Cultural Analysis, Nottingham
http://www.centrecath.leeds.ac.uk Centre for Cultural Analysis, Theory and History, University of Leeds
 Master of Applied Cultural Analysis Lund University, University of Copenhagen

Cultural anthropology